SS2 or SS-2 may refer to:

 SS2 (classification), a Les Autres sport classification
 Airframes Unlimited SS-2 Trainer, an American powered parachute design
 Pindad SS2, an Indonesian assault rifle made to replace the SS1
 , one of the earliest submarines of the United States Navy
 R-2 (missile) (NATO reporting name: SS-2 Sibling), Soviet Union manufactured improvement of the V-2 rocket 
 Scimitar SS2, a 1988 model of the Reliant Scimitar
 Setanta Sports 1 & 2 (SS1 & SS2), subscription based sports channels in the Republic of Ireland and Northern Ireland
 Short Circuit 2, a 1988 motion picture
 SpaceShipTwo, a suborbital, air-launched spaceplane for carrying space tourists
 SPARCstation 2, the Sun SPARCstation 2 workstation
 Serious Sam 2, a 2005 first-person shooter
 Stick Soldiers 2, the second game in the Stick Soldiers video game series
 System Shock 2, a 1999 first-person action role-playing game
 SS2, Petaling Jaya, a Malaysian neighbourhood